The 2009 European Mountain Running Championships were held on 12 July in Telfes im Stubai, Austria. They were that year's area championships for mountain running, held by the European Athletic Association. The 2009 edition saw the introduction of two under-20s competitions into the championships programme, complementing the usual men's and women's senior races. The men's race was 11 km long and featured a total climb of 1300 m in altitude, while the women's and under-20s men's competitions were over 9.5 km and scaled a height of 950 m. The women's junior competition was held over 4 km with a total climb of 400 m.

Turkish runner Ahmet Arslan retained his European title for a second time in the men's senior race, following wins in 2007 and 2008. In the women's senior race, Martina Strähl took the honours over home favourite Andrea Mayr. Italian athletes dominated the team competitions at the championships, taking the gold medals in the senior men's and women's races, as well as the men's under-20s event. Turkish runners topped the podium in both the under-20s contests; Yusuf Alici and Derya Altintas won the boys and girls titles respectively.

Results

Men

Total participants: 80 runners and 19 teams.

Women

Total participants: 64 runners and 16 teams.

Under-20s men

Total participants: 59 runners and 14 teams.

Under-20s women

Total participants: 38 runners and 14 teams.
NB: The women's under-20s team competition was decided by the performances of each country's top two performers.

References

External links
Official website at European Athletics

European Mountain Running Championships
European Mountain Running Championships, 2009
European Mountain Running Championships, 2009
European Mountain Running Championships
International athletics competitions hosted by Austria